Frank Makosky (January 20, 1910 – January 10, 1987) was a Major League Baseball pitcher. In 26 career games, he had a 5–2 record, with a 4.97 ERA. He batted and threw right-handed.

Makosky was born in Boonton, New Jersey and died in Stroudsburg, Pennsylvania.

External links
Baseball Reference.com page

1910 births
1987 deaths
People from Boonton, New Jersey
New York Yankees players
Major League Baseball pitchers
Baseball players from New Jersey
Sportspeople from Morris County, New Jersey